Derek Hallas (born ) is an English former rugby union and professional rugby league footballer who played in the 1950s and 1960s, and coached rugby league in the 1960s.

Background
Derek Hallas was born in Leeds, West Riding of Yorkshire, England, and he was a pupil at Hunslet Carr County Primary School, Hunslet.

Playing career

International honours
Derek Hallas won caps for Great Britain (RL) while at Leeds in 1961 against France, and New Zealand.

County honours
Derek Hallas represented Yorkshire (RU) while at Roundhay, and represented Yorkshire (RL) while at Keighley.

Championship final appearances
Derek Hallas played right-, i.e. number 3, and scored two tries, in Leeds' 25-10 victory over Warrington in the Championship Final during the 1960–61 season at Odsal Stadium, Bradford on Saturday 20 May 1961, in front of a crowd of 52,177.

Club career
Derek Hallas played rugby union for Roundhay RFC, switching code to rugby league, he signed for Keighley in December 1953, signing for Leeds in January 1959 for £4,000 (based on increases in average earnings, this would be approximately £195,800 in 2016), he resigned for Keighley in October 1962 for £3,000 (based on increases in average earnings, this would be approximately £124,100 in 2016), before signing for Paramatta in April 1963.

References

External links
!Great Britain Statistics at englandrl.co.uk (statistics currently missing due to not having appeared for both Great Britain, and England)
Statistics at rugbyleagueproject.org
Statistics at stats.rleague.com
Keighley Into the 1960s
Rugby league legends help school Lindley pupils at Huddersfield University
From Bondi To Batley: Australians In English Rugby League
Leeds' first Championship win
1961–1970: The Holy Grail is captured
Leeds – Club History, Facts and Figures 
Photograph "1961 Leeds v Warrington" at rlhp.co.uk
Derek Hallas
Interview With Derek Hallas 
Tributes paid to former Leeds Rhinos’ winger Wilf Rosenberg
Legend Derek Hallas can't wait for new Keighley Cougars era
Legend Derek Hallas can't wait for new Keighley Cougars era
Cougars And Rhinos To Honour Former Player

1934 births
Living people
English rugby league coaches
English rugby league players
English rugby union players
Great Britain national rugby league team players
Halifax R.L.F.C. coaches
Keighley Cougars players
Leeds Tykes players
Leeds Rhinos players
Parramatta Eels players
Place of birth missing (living people)
Rugby league centres
Rugby league players from Leeds
Rugby union players from Leeds
Rugby union wings
Yorkshire County RFU players
Yorkshire rugby league team players